Komagawa Tarozaemon was a disciple under the famous Kamiizumi Ise no kami Nobutsuna, founder of Shinkage-ryū
Tarozaemon's Komagawa Kaishin-ryū was handed down through the Maeda clan of Kaga, where he taught the use of the tachi (long sword), kodachi (short sword), jitte (a hooked truncheon used for arresting and disarming), naginata (glaive), and two-sword fighting

Notes

Samurai
Japanese swordfighters
Martial arts school founders